Ivan Mikulić (born 30 January 1995) is a Croatian para taekwondo practitioner. He won the silver medal in the men's +75 kg event at the 2020 Summer Paralympics in Tokyo, Japan.

References

Living people
1995 births
Sportspeople from Split, Croatia
Croatian male taekwondo practitioners
Taekwondo practitioners at the 2020 Summer Paralympics
Medalists at the 2020 Summer Paralympics
Paralympic silver medalists for Croatia
Paralympic medalists in taekwondo
21st-century Croatian people